Wonder Woman 1984 (Original Motion Picture Soundtrack) is the soundtrack to the film of the same name. 
The music is composed and arranged by Hans Zimmer. It was released on December 16, 2020, by WaterTower Music.

Background
Hans Zimmer was composer for Wonder Woman 1984, replacing Rupert Gregson-Williams who scored the first film. Zimmer previously scored Man of Steel and Batman v Superman: Dawn of Justice, the first and second films in the DC Extended Universe, and the latter which also featured Wonder Woman. He is joined by David Fleming and Steve Mazzaro who provided additional music.

As part of DC FanDome 2020, WaterTower Music released the first track from the score, titled "Themyscira". Another track, "Open Road", was released on December 10 as part of the "Week of Wonder" social media promotion leading up to the film's release.

A variation of the song "Beautiful Lie" from Batman v Superman, composed by Zimmer and Junkie XL, was also used towards the end of the film, but is not present on the film's official soundtrack.

WaterTower released the album Wonder Woman 1984: Sketches from the Soundtrack on February 5, 2021, a compilation of eleven suites and sketches written by Zimmer for the film.

Track listing

Charts

References

External links
 Official site

2020 soundtrack albums
2020s film soundtrack albums
DC Extended Universe soundtracks
Film scores
WaterTower Music soundtracks
Wonder Woman (film series)
Wonder Woman in other media
Superhero film soundtracks
Hans Zimmer soundtracks